The Women's 200 metre freestyle S4 swimming event at the 2004 Summer Paralympics was competed on 21 September. It was won by Mayumi Narita, representing .

1st round

Heat 1
21 Sept. 2004, morning session

Heat 2
21 Sept. 2004, morning session

Final round

21 Sept. 2004, evening session

References

W
2004 in women's swimming